Devanesan Chokkalingam, also known as Deva, is a south Indian film composer and singer who predominantly works in Tamil Cinema. He has composed songs and provided background music for Tamil, Kannada, Telugu, and Malayalam films in a career spanning about 36 years. He has composed music for more than 400 films.

Personal life 
Deva was born to M. C. Chokkalingam and M. C. Krishnaveni. Even in his childhood, Deva was attracted to the world of music. Teaming up with Chandra Bose, he staged many musical programmes. He started learning classical music under Dhanraj and has completed a course in Western music at Trinity College of Music in London. His son Srikanth Deva is also a music director, as are his brothers, who have formed the duo Sabesh–Murali. His nephew Jai is an actor.

Career 
Before coming to cinema, Deva worked for some time in the television field. In those days, Deva's brothers were working in the musical troupes of Illayaraja and other music directors as instrumentalists.  His first film, Manasukketha Maharasa, was released in 1989. He was then called to work on the movie Vaigasi Poranthachu. After the release of Vaikaasi Poranthaachu, his name became known throughout the Tamil community.

The great music composer M. S. Viswanathan called him “thenisai thendral”, or the breeze of sweet music. So far, he has composed music for more than 400 films, which include Tamil, Telugu, Kannada and Malayalam films. He is also famous for his compositions for religious films. He was widely acclaimed for his scores for the Rajinikanth starrer Annamalai (1992) and Baashha (1995).

The 1990s belonged as much to Deva as it did to A. R. Rahman. In 1996, Deva composed tunes for 36 movies. His scores played a big role in the emergence of actors Ajith and Vijay, with hits such as Aasai (1995), Kadhal Kottai (1996), Nerrukku Ner (1997), Ninaithen Vandhai (1998), Priyamudan (1998), Vaalee (1999), Kushi (2000) helping them establish themselves as the next-generation superstars.

In 2014, Anirudh Ravichander chose Deva to sing a gaana song in his album Maan Karate.

in 2021, Santhosh Narayanan chose Deva to sing a song in his album Maari

Awards
In 1990, he received his first Tamil Nadu State Film Award for Best Music Director. He received the Tamil Nadu Government's Kalaimamani Award in the year 1992. In 1995, the film Aasai brought him another state film award. For Baashha, he got the Tamil Nadu Arts and Cultural Academy Award. He received an award by Guinness world records for Sivappu Mazhai as the world fastest movie from script to screening. He has also been honoured by awards from popular journals like Dinakaran, Cinema Express and Screen. He won the Filmfare Award for Best Music Director - Kannada film Amrutha Varshini.

Filmography

Tamil films

Kannada films

Telugu films

Malayalam films

Television
 2007 Vaira Nenjam
 2007 Bharathi
 2008 Thangamana Purushan
 2009 Vilakku Vacha Nerathula
 2013 Mahabharatham

Singer

Onscreen appearances

Reused tunes
Kotigobba (2001) from Baashha (1995) (3 songs added with one of them being reused version of "Athanda Ithanda" from Arunachalam (1997))
Simhadriya Simha from Kattabomman (1 song "Priya Priya" has been reused; while "Kalladre Naanu" was reused as "Poove Mudhal Poove" in Kadhal Kirukkan with different vocals and instrumentations; "Malnad Adike" was reused from "Kottapaakum" in Nattamai).
Naaga from Kushi (3 songs "Megam Karukuthu", "Macarina" and "Oru Ponnu" has been reused).
Nata (2002) from Priyamudhan (1997) (3 songs "Bharathikku", "Pooja Vaa", and "Mowriya" have been reused).

References

Tamil musicians
Tamil film score composers
Musicians from Chennai
Kannada film score composers
Living people
Tamil Nadu State Film Awards winners
1950 births
Indian male film score composers